Piletocera albicilialis is a moth in the family Crambidae. It was described by George Hampson in 1907. It is found in Brazil (Lower Amazons).

References

albicilialis
Moths described in 1907
Taxa named by George Hampson
Moths of South America